Guangzhou Baolong Motors Co. Ltd., or previously Guangzhou Oriental Baolong Automotive Industry Co. Ltd., (广州宝龙) was an automobile manufacturer from the People's Republic of China.

Company history 
Yang Longjiang founded the company in June 1998 in Guangzhou, and began the production of automobiles under the brand name Baolong. Production took place in three plants located in Guangzhou and one plant located in Zhanjiang. By 2005, the production has ended.

In September 2005, FAW Hongta and FAW Baolong Light Vehicle joined forces to found the successor company FAW Baolong Light Vehicle.

Vehicles 
Initially, Baolong produced bullet-proof vehicles based on Mitsubishi V31 and V33, Ford Transit, Renault Trafic and a few other Mitsubishi models.

In April 2004, Matra bought the rights to the Renault Espace III.

Before the defunct in 2005, the lone passenger vehicle product is the Baolong Pegasus MPV. The Baolong Pegasus was later rebadged as the FAW Freewind.

Production

External links 

 d’Auto (Dutch)
 http://www.blqc-china.com/

References 

Car manufacturers of China
Vehicle manufacturing companies established in 1998
Chinese companies established in 1998
Chinese brands
Car brands